The Rodale Organic Gardening Experimental Farm, also known as the Working Tree Center, is a historic home and farm located in Lynn Township, Lehigh County, Pennsylvania. It is important in the history of organic gardening and farming in the 20th century.

History
The home on the experimental farm's property is a farmhouse which dates to roughly the year 1830. It was altered by J. I. Rodale (1898-1971) in order to improve the quality of life at his residence and further his work during 1940 to 1971. Also added by Rodale were a farm office and greenhouse (circa 1945), turkey/goose coop, tennis court, cabana and pool, pavilion, and clapboard and fieldstone bake house, as well as five garden sites: the cultivated gardens, the stone gardens, the Sir Albert Howard test plots, and the aerobic and anaerobic compost heaps.  The farm is important in the history of organic gardening and farming in the 20th century.

Other buildings and structures which pre-dated Rodale's 1940 purchase include: the Pennsylvania bank barn, implement shed, corn crib, and chicken coop.

The property was added to the National Register of Historic Places in 1999.

References

External links

Rodale Inc. history

Buildings and structures in Lehigh County, Pennsylvania
Farms on the National Register of Historic Places in Pennsylvania
National Register of Historic Places in Lehigh County, Pennsylvania
Organic farming in the United States